Iris Vera Tanner (20 November 1906 – 22 February 1971) was an English swimmer born in Eastbourne, who competed in the 1924 Summer Olympics and 1928 Summer Olympics. At the 1924 Olympics she won a silver medal in the 4×100 m freestyle relay event and was fifth in the 100 m freestyle event. In the 400 m freestyle competition she was eliminated in the semi-finals. Four years later in Amsterdam she won her second silver medal in the 4×100 m freestyle relay event, was sixth in the 400 m freestyle event and was fourth in her heat in the semi-finals of 100 m freestyle event and did not advance.

See also
 List of Olympic medalists in swimming (women)

References

External links
Iris Tanner's profile at Sports Reference.com
Iris Tanner's profile at databaseOlympics

1906 births
1971 deaths
English female swimmers
English female freestyle swimmers
Olympic swimmers of Great Britain
Swimmers at the 1924 Summer Olympics
Swimmers at the 1928 Summer Olympics
Olympic silver medallists for Great Britain
Medalists at the 1928 Summer Olympics
Medalists at the 1924 Summer Olympics
Olympic silver medalists in swimming
Sportspeople from Eastbourne